Josh Nasser (born 23 June 1999 in Australia) is an Australian rugby union player who plays for the Queensland Reds in Super Rugby. His playing position is hooker. He has signed for the Reds squad in 2020.

Reference list

External links
Rugby.com.au profile
itsrugby.co.uk profile

Living people
1999 births
Place of birth missing (living people)
Australian rugby union players
Rugby union props
Queensland Reds players
Rugby union hookers
Brisbane City (rugby union) players